Ertel Run is a stream in the U.S. state of Ohio. It is a tributary to the Little Miami River.

Ertel Run was named after an early settler. A variant spelling was "Ertle Run".

References

Rivers of Warren County, Ohio
Rivers of Ohio